Eyvindur  is an Icelandic-language variant of the given name Eyvind. Notable people with the name include:

 Fjalla-Eyvindur (1714–1783), Icelandic outlaw
 Eyvindur P. Eiríksson (born 1935), Icelandic writer

Icelandic masculine given names